Birth alert or hospital alert is a practice in Canada, in which a social or health care worker notifies the staff of a hospital if they have concerns for the safety of an expected child based on their parents' history. This can include past instances of poverty, domestic violence, drug usage, and history with child welfare. Birth alerts are typically issued without the parents' consent, and often result in apprehension and placement of the child into foster care after birth.

Birth alerts have been considered a controversial practice, as they have been disproportionately used for Indigenous children. The Indigenous rights group Idle No More considers birth alerts to be one of the major "hardships" faced by Canada's Indigenous community. In June 2019, the Final Report of the National Inquiry into Missing and Murdered Indigenous Women and Girls (MMIWG) recommended the abolishment of "the practice of targeting and apprehending infants (hospital alerts or birth alerts) from Indigenous mothers right after they give birth", as they were "racist and discriminatory and are a gross violation of the rights of the child, the mother, and the community." 

Following the release of the report, the practice of birth alerts was discontinued in multiple provinces in the years that followed. , the only remaining province to practice birth alerts is Quebec.

Usage

Alberta 
Alberta ended birth alerts in 2019.

British Columbia 
In March 2018, the Supreme Court of British Columbia ordered that the Ministry of Children and Family Development (MCFD) return a child to their mother, and coordinate community support and supervision within the Huu-ay-aht First Nations. Under a birth alert, the child was apprehended after birth, with the mother only allowed limited visits. The court ruled that the MCFD violated the Child, Family and Community Service Act by not providing an adequate reason for the measure besides "her own mother's history with MCFD", and not providing the mother with advance notice of the decision.

In July 2019, following the MMIWG report, Minister of Children and Family Development Katrine Conroy suggested that the province was looking into its recommendations, explaining that "we know there are far too many Indigenous kids taken into care", and that "especially in the Indigenous communities, we are making sure there are more supports in place and working in partnership with the communities so that those children have the support they need – that the parents have the support they need."

In September 2019, Conroy announced that provincial health care providers and social service workers "will no longer share information about expectant parents without consent from those parents and will stop the practice of birth alerts." She emphasized that "moving to a voluntary approach of providing early supports and preventative services to expectant parents will help them plan and safely care for their babies."

Manitoba 
On June 23, 2020, Manitoba announced that it would end birth alerts on June 30. Minister of Families Heather Stefanson stated that "our government believes that strong families are the cornerstone of our province and we understand that to strengthen our families we need to ensure they are supported by the community organizations that serve at-risk parents and children each and every day in our communities." Manitoba Child and Family Services would provide referrals to support programs such as Mount Carmel Clinic's Mothering Project—which concurrently received additional government funding to help double the program's capacity.

New Brunswick 
In January 2021, the Ministry of Social Development stated that the province has been reviewing its use of birth alerts. The practice was ended in October 2021.

Newfoundland and Labrador 
In January 2021, the provincial Ministry of Children, Seniors and Social Development stated that it was reviewing its use of birth alerts, consistent with the recommendations of the MMIWG inquiry and the Truth and Reconciliation Commission. The province ended the use of birth alerts in June 2021.

Nova Scotia 
Nova Scotia ended the use of birth alerts in November 2021.

Ontario 
On July 14, 2020, Associate Minister of Children and Women's Issues Jill Dunlop directed Ontario's Children's Aid Societies to stop issuing birth alerts by October 15, 2020. Dunlop stated that "we're trying to work to collaborate with families. That families have a voice in their plans moving forward. And birth alerts just do the exact opposite."

Quebec 
Birth alerts have been used in Quebec since 2009.

Prince Edward Island 
On February 1, 2021, PEI ended its use of birth alerts.

Saskatchewan 
In January 2021, the province announced that it would end its use of birth alerts on February 1, 2021.

Yukon 
The Yukon last issued a birth alert in 2017, and ended the practice in 2019.

See also 
 Sixties Scoop

References 

Child welfare
Indigenous child displacement in Canada